Paul Courtenay Hyu is a British–Chinese actor, writer and director. He works in English and German.  He is sometimes credited as Paul Hyu, especially for his work as Elvis Impersonator, "ChineseElvis".

Life and career
Hyu was born in London. He was educated at Ashville College in Harrogate, where he was Head of Briggs House and won the school's drama prize.  He also won the school's German prize, though he did not continue to study the subject, instead taking Maths, Physics and Chemistry and General Studies at A-level.

He gained a place at the London Theatre School, where he studied under Barbara Buckmaster, Belinda Quirey MBE, Norman Ayrton and Charles Duff, winning Mike Loades' prize fight competition with Christopher Chaplin, son of Charlie Chaplin.
  
He took over as Artistic Director of the multi award-winning Mu-Lan Theatre Company from Glen Goei in 1997. Before the company closed due to a withdrawal of funding from the London Arts Board in 2005, he implemented the UK's first East Asian Youth Theatre and East Asian New Writing Programmes, working with the Shared Experience, Paines Plough and Royal Court Theatre theatre companies.  He also created and wrote for the UK's first East Asian sketch comedy troupe, "Mu-Lan's Frying Circus", and he produced and directed the 1st British Chinese repertory theatre production of Shakespeare, Romeo and Juliet at Basingstoke Haymarket and Jersey Opera House, set in Shanghai in the 1930s. Under his leadership, Mu-Lan was nominated for the Manchester Evening News Awards (winner), Diverse Acts Award (winner), Carlton Multi-Cultural Achievement Award and the Peter Brook Empty Space Award.  Hyu himself was nominated for a Chinese Community Pearl Award in 2006 for Excellence in Media.

Under the banner of Mu-Lan, Hyu wrote and starred in the controversial 4-part C4 satirical TV sketch show, The Missing Chink. He was Associate Producer of the UK's first British Chinese sketch comedy TV show pilot, Sweet n Sour Comedy, produced by Baby Cow Productions.

In 1999, as an actor, Hyu created the part of Timothy Wong, The Chinese Elvis in Charlotte Jones' award-winning play Martha, Josie and the Chinese Elvis at the Octagon Theatre Bolton. He went on the play the part again in 2001 with Belinda Lang in the role of Martha and again lastly in 2007 with Maureen Lipman.  Hyu's performance in this part in 1999 was so popular that he received multiple offers of work as an Elvis impersonator. Living close to the famous Gracelands Palace Chinese Elvis restaurant on the Old Kent Road in South East London, Hyu started working there as "ChineseElvis", an Elvis Tribute character act, who gained some fame in the UK most notably for fronting a national advertising campaign for AOL and winning an International Elvis charity special edition of The Weakest Link, raising £5750 for the NSPCC. In 2005, Hyu went back to Harrogate to perform as ChineseElvis as part of a gala night of fundraising for the Royal Hall. Hyu stars in one of the videos made by Junkie XL for his 2002 worldwide hit remix of A Little Less Conversation. Hyu has appeared at many London venues as ChineseElvis, including the Hippodrome, London, Oxo Tower, Annabel's, The Ivy as well as The Jolly Roger party boat in Barbados.  People who have hired him for private functions include Sir Bob Geldof, Angelina Jolie, Richard Caring and Justin Lin.

Films

Television

Video games

Theatre

Radio Drama

References 

Year of birth missing (living people)
Living people
20th-century British male actors
English people of Chinese descent
21st-century British male actors
British male film actors
British male television actors
British male actors of Chinese descent
British male video game actors
British male voice actors
Male actors from London
People educated at Ashville College